Carie is an unincorporated community in Ripley County, in the U.S. state of Missouri.

History
A post office called Carie was established in 1898, and remained in operation until 1915. The etymology of Carie is unknown.

References

Unincorporated communities in Ripley County, Missouri
Unincorporated communities in Missouri